Lord Edward FitzGerald (15 October 1763 – 4 June 1798) was an Irish aristocrat who abandoned his prospects as a distinguished veteran of British service in the American War of Independence, and as an Irish Parliamentarian, to embrace the cause of an independent Irish republic. Unable to reconcile with Ireland's Protestant Ascendancy or with the Kingdom's English-appointed administration, he sought inspiration in revolutionary France where, in 1792, he met and befriended Thomas Paine. From 1796 he became a leading proponent within the Society of United Irishmen of a French-assisted insurrection. On the eve of the intended uprising in May 1798 he was fatally wounded in the course of arrest.

Early years
FitzGerald, the fifth son of the 1st Duke of Leinster and the Lady Emily Lennox (daughter of Charles Lennox, 2nd Duke of Richmond), was born at Carton House, near Dublin. In 1773 his father died and his mother soon afterwards married William Ogilvie, who had been the tutor for him and his siblings. He spent most of his childhood in Frescati House at Blackrock in Dublin where he was tutored by Ogilvie in a manner chiefly directed to the acquisition of knowledge that would fit him for a military career.

American War of Independence
FitzGerald joined the British Army in 1779 and then became Aide-de-camp on the staff of Lord Rawdon in the southern theatre of the American Revolutionary War. He was seriously wounded at the Battle of Eutaw Springs on 8 September 1781, his life being saved by an escaped slave named Tony Small (nicknamed "Faithful Tony", see Black Loyalist).  FitzGerald commissioned a portrait of Tony Small by John Roberts in 1786. Lord Edward freed Small and employed him to the end of his life. FitzGerald was evacuated from Charleston, South Carolina in 1782 when the British forces abandoned the city. Webb surmises that the success of the American colonists in fighting against regular troops, led him in later years to the conviction that his countrymen in Ireland could cope with them with a similar result.

Post-war military career
In 1783 FitzGerald visited the West Indies before returning to Ireland, where his brother, the 2nd Duke of Leinster, had procured Edward's election to the Irish Parliament as a Member for Athy, a seat he held until 1790. In Parliament he acted with the small Opposition Irish Patriot Party group led by Henry Grattan, but took no prominent part in debate. In the spring of 1786 he took the then unusual step for a young nobleman of entering the Military College, Woolwich, after which he made a tour through Spain in 1787. Dejected by unrequited love for his cousin Georgina Lennox (who later married the 3rd Earl Bathurst), he sailed for New Brunswick to join the 54th Regiment with the rank of Major.

Explorer in the New World
In April 1789, guided by compass, he traversed the country with a brother officer, from Fredericton, New Brunswick to Quebec, falling in with Indians by the way, with whom he fraternized. He accomplished the journey, which is 225 miles by rhumb line (and today 365 miles by road) in twenty-six days, and established a shorter practicable route than that hitherto followed. The rhumb line crosses the extremely rugged and heavily forested northern part of the present state of Maine.

In a subsequent expedition he was formally adopted at Detroit by the Bear clan of the Kanien'kehá:ka (Mohawk) with the name "Eghnidal" by Karonghyontye (Captain David Hill), and made his way down the Mississippi to New Orleans, whence he returned to England.

Enters politics

Finding that his brother had procured his election for the County of Kildare (a seat he held from 1790 to 1798), and desiring to maintain political independence, Lord Edward refused the command of an expedition against Cadiz offered him by Pitt, and devoted himself for the next few years to the pleasures of society and to his parliamentary duties. He was on terms of intimacy with his first cousin Charles Fox, with Richard Sheridan and other leading Whigs. According to Thomas Moore, Lord Edward FitzGerald was the only one of the numerous suitors of Sheridan's first wife, Elizabeth, whose attentions were received with favour; and it is certain that, whatever may have been its limits, a warm mutual affection subsisted between the two. She conceived a child by him, a baby girl who was born on 30 March 1792(died October 1793).

Marries on the Continent
His Whig connections, together with his transatlantic experiences, predisposed Fitzgerald to sympathize with the doctrines of the French Revolution, which he embraced enthusiastically when he visited Paris in October 1792. He lodged with Thomas Paine and listened to the debates in the Convention. At a convivial gathering on 18 November, he supported a toast to "the speedy abolition of all hereditary titles and feudal distinctions", and gave proof of his zeal by expressly repudiating his own title, a performance for which he was dismissed from the army.

While in Paris, FitzGerald became enamoured of a young girl whom he chanced to see at the theatre, and who is said to have had a striking likeness to Elizabeth Sheridan. Procuring an introduction he discovered her to be a protégée of Stéphanie Félicité, comtesse de Genlis (Madame de Sillery), Governess to the Children of France. The parentage of the girl, whose name was Pamela (1773–1831), is uncertain; but although there is some evidence to support the story of Madame de Genlis that Pamela was born in Newfoundland of parents called Sims, the common belief that she was the daughter of Madame de Genlis herself by Louis Philippe II, Duke of Orléans (to whose children she was then acting as governess), was probably well founded. On 27 December 1792, FitzGerald and Pamela were married at Tournai, one of the witnesses being Louis Philippe, afterwards King of the French; and in January 1793 the couple reached Dublin.

Return to Ireland

Ireland was by then seething with dissent which was finding a focus in the increasingly popular and revolutionary Society of the United Irishmen, which had been forced underground by the outbreak of war between France and Britain in 1793. Lord Edward FitzGerald, fresh from the gallery of the Convention in Paris, returned to his seat in the Irish Parliament and immediately sprang to their defence. Within a week of his return he was ordered into custody and required to apologise at the bar of the House of Commons for violently denouncing in the House a Government proclamation which Grattan had approved for the suppression of the United-Irish attempt to revive the Irish Volunteer movement with a "National Guard". However, it was not until 1796 that he joined the United Irishmen, who by now had given up as hopeless the path of constitutional reform and whose aim, after the recall of Lord FitzWilliam in 1795, was nothing less than the establishment of an independent Irish republic.

Revolutionary activities
In May 1796 Theobald Wolfe Tone was in Paris endeavouring to obtain French assistance for an insurrection in Ireland. In the same month, FitzGerald and his friend Arthur O'Connor proceeded to Hamburg, where they opened negotiations with the Directory through Reinhard, French minister to the Hanseatic towns. The Duke of York, meeting Pamela at Devonshire House on her way through London with her husband, had told her that "all was known" about his plans, and advised her to persuade him not to go abroad. Also, in Hamburg Lord Edward met with Johan Anders Jägerhorn (or baron de Spurila, as he called himself), a Finnish Swede who had advocated Finnish autonomy and now acted as an intermediary between Lord Edward and the French.

The proceedings of the conspirators at Hamburg were made known to the government in London by an informer, Samuel Turner. Pamela was entrusted with all her husband's secrets and took an active part in furthering his designs. She appears to have fully deserved the confidence placed in her, though there is reason to suppose that at times she counselled prudence. The result of the Hamburg negotiations was Hoche's abortive expedition to Bantry Bay in December 1796.

In September 1797 the Government learnt from the informer Leonard McNally that Lord Edward was among those directing the conspiracy of the United Irishmen, which was now quickly maturing. He was specially concerned with the military organisation, in which he held the post of colonel of the Kildare regiment and head of the military committee. He had papers showing that men were ready to rise. They possessed some arms, but the supply was insufficient, and the leaders were hoping for a French invasion to make good the deficiency and to give support to a popular uprising. But French help proving dilatory and uncertain, the rebel leaders in Ireland were divided in opinion as to the expediency of taking the field without waiting for foreign aid. Lord Edward was among the advocates of the bolder course and there is some evidence that he favoured a project for the massacre of the Irish peers while in procession to the House of Lords for the trial of Lord Kingston in May 1798.

Net tightens
It was probably abhorrence of such measures that converted Thomas Reynolds from a conspirator to an informer; at all events, by him and several others the authorities were kept posted in what was going on, though lack of evidence produced in court delayed the arrest of the ringleaders. But on 12 March 1798 Reynolds' information led to the seizure of a number of conspirators at the house of Oliver Bond. Lord Edward FitzGerald, warned by Reynolds, was not among them.

As a fellow member of the Ascendancy class, the Government were anxious to make an exception for FitzGerald, avoiding the embarrassing and dangerous consequences of his subversive activities. They communicated their willingness to spare him from the normal fate meted out to traitors. The Lord Chancellor, Lord Clare, said to a member of his family, "For God's sake get this young man out of the country; the ports shall be thrown open, and no hindrance whatever offered".

FitzGerald however refused to desert others who could not escape, and whom he had himself led into danger. On 30 March the government proclamation of martial law authorising the military to act as they saw fit to crush the United Irishmen led to a campaign of vicious brutality in several parts of the country. This forced the United Irish executive to bring forward plans for the rising, with or without French aid.

Arrest and death

Lord Edward FitzGerald's social position made him the most important United Irish leader still at liberty. On 9 May a reward of £1,000 was offered by Dublin Castle for his apprehension. Since the arrests at Bond's, FitzGerald had been in hiding, but had twice visited his wife in disguise and was himself visited by his stepfather Ogilvie and his friend William Lawless; he generally observed less caution than his situation required. Meanwhile, the date for the rising was finally fixed for 23 May and FitzGerald awaited the day hidden by Mary Moore above her family's inn in Thomas Street Dublin.

Tipped off that the house was going to be raided, Moore turned to Francis Magan, a Catholic barrister and trusted sympathiser, who agreed to hide Fitzgerald. Making their way to Magan's on May 18, Fitzgerald's party was challenged by Major Henry Sirr and a company of Dumbarton Fencibles. Moore escaped with Fitzgerald (William Putnam McCabe and other of his bodyguard were arrested) and took him back to Thomas Street to the house of Nicholas Murphy.

Moore explained to Magan what had happened and, unbeknownst to her, Magan informed Dublin Castle. The Moores were raided that day. Mary, running to warn the Leinster Directory meeting nearby in James’s Gate, received a bayonet cut across the shoulders.

That same evening Sirr stormed Murphy's house where Lord Edward was in bed suffering from a fever. Alerted by the commotion, FitzGerald jumped out of bed and, ignoring the pleas of the arresting officers Captain William Bellingham Swan (later assistant town Major of Dublin) and Captain Daniel Frederick Ryan to surrender peacefully, FitzGerald stabbed Swan and mortally wounded Ryan with a dagger in a desperate attempt to escape. He was secured only after Major Sirr shot him in the shoulder.

FitzGerald was conveyed to New Prison, Dublin where he was denied proper medical treatment.  After a brief detention in Dublin Castle he was taken to Newgate Prison, Dublin where his wound, which had become infected, became mortally inflamed. His wife, whom the government probably had enough evidence to convict of treason, had fled the country, never to see her husband again, but Lord Edward's brother Henry and his aunt Lady Louisa Conolly were allowed to see him in his last moments. Lord Edward died at the age of 34 on 4 June 1798 as the rebellion raged outside. He was buried the next day in the cemetery of St Werburgh's Church, Dublin. An Act of Attainder confiscating his property was passed as 38 Geo. 3 c. 77, but was eventually repealed in 1819.

The weapon used by Lord Edward to attack Captains Swan and Ryan while trying to escape arrest was later stolen from Major Swan's house by Emma Lucretia Dobbin, the daughter of Rev. William Dobbin and Catherine Coote. The scabbard he reputedly had at his arrest is held at Limerick Museum.

Character assessment
Shortly after his death, Fitzgerald's sister, Lady Lucy FitzGerald, authored the following statement regarding her brother's fidelity to Ireland:

Fitzgerald was of small stature and handsome features. In the opinion of the McNeill biography in the Encyclopædia Britannica eleventh edition (1911) Fitzgerald's character and career have been made the subject of eulogies much beyond their merits.

The same writer claims:

This opinion is not that held in Ireland, where Fitzgerald is remembered as brave and sweet-natured, a clever planner, and a tragic loss. His funeral is described:

Family
FitzGerald and Pamela had the following children:

 Edward Fox FitzGerald (10 October 1794 – 25 January 1863) who married on 6 November 1827 to Jane Paul (died 2 November 1891)
 Pamela FitzGerald (1795/1796 - 25 November 1869), married on 21 November 1820 Sir Guy Campbell, 1st Baronet (died 26 January 1849)
 Lucy Louisa FitzGerald (1798 - September 1826), married on 5 September 1825 Capt. George Francis Lyon (died 8 October 1832).

Memorials
There are Lord Edward Streets named in his honour in many places in Ireland, such as Dublin, Limerick, Sligo, Kilkenny, Ballina, Ballymote, and Ballycullenbeg in County Laois.

Sporting Associations
The County Roscommon GAA club Tulsk Lord Edward's is named after Fitzgerald. The Geraldines P. Moran GAA club in Cornelscourt in Dublin is also partly named after him.

Ancestry

Notes

References

Attribution:

Further reading

Encyclopædia Britannica eleventh edition in an endnote included the following sources :
 Thomas Moore, Life and Death of Lord Edward Fitzgerald (2 vols., London, 1832), also a revised edition entitled The Memoirs of Lord Edward Fitzgerald, edited with supplementary particulars by Martin MacDermott (London, 1897) (A public domain online version of this, scanned for a Google project, can be found here)
 R. R. Madden, The United Irishmen (7 vols., Dublin, 1842–46)
 C. H. Teelin Personal Narrative of the Irish Rebellion of 1798 (Belfast, 1832)
 W. J. Fitzpatrick, The Sham Squire, The Rebellion of Ireland and the Informers of 1798 (Dublin, 1866) and Secret Service under Pitt (London, 1892)
 J. A. Froude, The English in Ireland in the Eighteenth Century (3 vols., London, 1872–74)
 W. E. H. Lecky, History of England in the Eighteenth Century, vols. vii. and viii. (London, 1896)
 Thomas Reynolds the younger, The Life of Thomas Reynolds (London, 1839)
 The Life and Letters of Lady Sarah Lennox, edited by the countess of llchester and Lord Stavordale (London, 1901)
 Ida A. Taylor, The Life of Lord Edward Fitzgerald (London, 1903), which gives a prejudiced and distorted picture of Pamela.
For particulars of Pamela, and especially as to the question of her parentage, see
 Gerald Campbell, Edward and Pamela Fitzgerald (London, 1904)
 Memoirs of Madame de Genlis (London, 1825)
 Georgette Ducrest, Chroniques populaires (Paris, 1855)
 Thomas Moore, Memoirs of the Life of R. B. Sheridan (London, 1825. R. J. M.)

1763 births
1798 deaths
Irish Anglicans
Irish MPs 1783–1790
Irish MPs 1790–1797
Members of the Parliament of Ireland (pre-1801) for County Kildare constituencies
People from Maynooth
People from Thames Ditton
People convicted under a bill of attainder
United Irishmen
Younger sons of dukes
Edward
Protestant Irish nationalists